Jill Griffiths Hall (born 16 November 1949) is an Australian former politician who served as a member of the Australian House of Representatives, from 1998 until 2016, representing the seat of Shortland, New South Wales for the Labor Party. She is aligned with the ALP's Socialist Left faction.

Early life and education
Hall was born in Macksville, New South Wales, and was educated at University of Newcastle.

Career
She was a rehabilitation counsellor before entering politics. Hall was member of the New South Wales Legislative Assembly for Swansea from 1995 to 1998.

Of all the members of the 51st Legislative Assembly between 1995 and 1999, she and Alby Schultz were the last to have resigned to successfully contest a Federal seat. (The others were John Fahey, Ian Causley and Paul Zammit.)

Hall was a Labor Whip from October 2004 to November 2012, serving in both Opposition and Government. Prior to entering NSW and Federal politics, Hall was a Councillor on Lake Macquarie City Council.

References

External links

1949 births
Living people
Australian Labor Party members of the Parliament of Australia
Members of the Australian House of Representatives
Members of the Australian House of Representatives for Shortland
Members of the New South Wales Legislative Assembly
Women members of the Australian House of Representatives
University of Newcastle (Australia) alumni
Labor Left politicians
21st-century Australian politicians
21st-century Australian women politicians
20th-century Australian politicians
Women members of the New South Wales Legislative Assembly
20th-century Australian women politicians